Richie Kidd is a British DJ and producer. Richie is a Fierce Angel and one half of the group 2 Deep Geeks. He is primarily known in the house music circuit in Europe and the Middle East. Richie has worked alongside many famous artists and producers throughout his career including Danny Rampling, Jamie Lewis, Vanilla Ice and Semus Haji to name a few. Richie worked at Long's Bar (Tower's Rotana Hotel) in Dubai in 2008 as the resident DJ
 Between Fall 2008 and Spring 2009 Richie worked as the Resident DJ at Club Maxxim in Bahrain. Richie currently works as the resident DJ at Barasti Beach Club in Dubai.

Discography

Singles
 2011 "Juke Box", Mixtura Records
 2011 "Golden (Revival Remix)", Mixtura Records
 2011 "If Ya Feel The Beat", Greenhouse Records
 2010 "Plans For The Weekend", Tastie Music
 2009 "Blame It On The Jazz", Illuminati Records
 2009 "Blame It On The Jazz (That Funky Bass Mix)", Illuminati Records
 2009 "Jacuba", Illuminati Records

2 Deep Geeks
 2010 "Making Me High", Mixtura Records

Remixes
 2011 Housegroove - "Jazzy Movement (Richie Kidd Deep Drunk Funk Filter Mix)" Dirty Monkey
 2011 Tom Drummond - "Lets Dance (Richie Kidd)" Tastie
 2010 MC Spanish Fly - "Blinded By The Light (Richie Kidd Space Disco Mix)"
 2008 Dap-C feat. Sholla Amar, Lil Wayne & Phil Ashmore - "Everything To Me (Richie Kidd That East Mix)"
 2008 Sean Kingston – "Take You There (Richie Kidd Sunshine Club Mix)"
 2008 Nelly Furtardo – "Do it (Richie Kidd Smooth House Mix)"
 2008 Tovar Vsk Warren - "Call It Fate Then Say Something (Richie Kidd Mix)"
 2007 Snoop Dogg - "Sexual Eruption (Richie Kidd Remix)"
 2007 Estel - "American Boy (Richie Kidd 2 step Garage Mix)"
 2007 Shayne Ward – "You Make Me Wish (Richie Kidd Sunshine Remix)"
 2006 Mutya Buena - "Fast Car (SoulfullSexySound Remix)"
 2006 De La Soul - "Ring Ring Ring He He Ha Ha (Richie Kidd Mix)"
 2006 Roger Sanchez, D Ramirez Feat. Lisa Pure - "Lost vs. Lost (Richie Kidd Remix)"
 2005 LL Cool J - "Doin It (Richie Kidd Remix)"
 2003 F.P.I – "Reach In Paradise (Richie Kidd Mix)"
 2003 "Butterflies Studio Junkies (Richie Kidd Remix)"

Awards and nominations
Won an NME Award for his underground release on YouTube of "Doin it LL Cool J Remix Richie Kidd 2005"

References

External links
 Richie Kidd Official Website
 
 Richie Kidd MySpace

1976 births
Club DJs
English DJs
English electronic musicians
English house musicians
Remixers
Living people
Electronic dance music DJs